The 1986 North Carolina Tar Heels football team represented the University of North Carolina at Chapel Hill during the 1986 NCAA Division I-A football season. The Tar Heels were led by ninth-year head coach Dick Crum and played their home games at Kenan Memorial Stadium in Chapel Hill, North Carolina. They competed as members of the Atlantic Coast Conference, finishing tied for second. North Carolina was invited to the 1986 Aloha Bowl, where they lost to Arizona.

Schedule

Personnel

Season summary

The Citadel
Derrick Fenner 216 rush yards

at Florida State
Derrick Fenner ran into coach Dick Crum, causing a leg injury for the latter.

Virginia

Derrick Fenner sets single game ACC rushing record (benched for first two series for missing practice during the week)
Dick Crum's 100th career win
North Carolina's Eric Lewis and Virginia's Eric Clay were ejected in second quarter for fighting
Transfer Chuck Tabor (sitting out season) ripped down a "Fire Crum" banner after Fenner's second touchdown run
North Carolina's late touchdown pass angered Virginia players but Virginia had called timeout just prior to the scoring play

References

North Carolina
North Carolina Tar Heels football seasons
North Carolina Tar Heels football